National DNA Day is a United States holiday celebrated on April 25. It commemorates the day in 1953 when James Watson, Francis Crick, Maurice Wilkins, Rosalind Franklin and colleagues published papers in the journal Nature on the structure of DNA. Furthermore, in early April 2003 it was declared that the Human Genome Project was very close to complete, and "the remaining tiny gaps were considered too costly to fill."

In the United States, DNA Day was first celebrated on April 25, 2003, by proclamation of both the Senate and the House of Representatives. However, they only declared a one-time celebration, not an annual holiday. Every year from 2003 onward, annual DNA Day celebrations have been organized by the National Human Genome Research Institute (NHGRI), starting as early as April 23 in 2010, April 15 in 2011 and April 20 in 2012. April 25 has since been declared "International DNA Day" and "World DNA Day" by several groups. 

Genealogical DNA testing companies and genetic genealogy publishers run annual sales around DNA Day, seeking interest from the public and promoting their services.

References

External links
National DNA Day (official website)
National DNA Day on Facebook
National DNA Day on Twitter

April observances
Unofficial observances
International observances
Observances about science